The Carlsbad Potashers were a minor league baseball team based in Carlsbad, New Mexico.  Carlsbad teams played as members of the Longhorn League from 1953 to 1955, Southwestern League in 1956 and 1957 and Sophomore League from 1958 to 1961, winning the 1953 league championship. Carlsbad played as a minor league affiliate of the Chicago Cubs from 1958 to 1961 and hosted home games at Montgomery Field.

In 1959, at Montgomery Field in Carlsbad, Potasher player Gil Carter hit a home run claimed have traveled 733 feet, possibly the longest in professional baseball history.

History
The Carlsbad Potashers began minor league play in 1953. Carlsbad teams played as members of the Class C level Longhorn League (1953–1955), the Class B level Southwestern League (1956–1957) and Class D level Sophomore League (1958–1961) during their nine seasons of play.

In their first season, the 1953 Potashers finished with a record of 80–52 and captured the Longhorn League Championship. The 1954 and 1959 teams lost in the league Finals

The Potashers attendance was 83,462 in their first season of 1953, an average of 1,265 per game. In their last season, 1961, they drew 14,974 an average of 236 per game.

Gil Carter: Possibly longest home run in history
As reported in The Sporting News, Potashers player Gil Carter hit a majestic home run at Montgomery Field in 1959:
"On a hot August night in 1959, former heavyweight boxer Gil Carter smashed a pitch through Carlsbad's high-elevated air and out of Montgomery Field. The ball carried over the left field wall, soared past two city streets and landed in a peach tree. A newspaper reporter later took an aerial photo from a plane and used the picture to estimate the ball traveled 733 feet. Carter's hometown paper, The Topeka Capital-Journal, said "the blast is considered the longest home run in baseball history."

The official scorer estimated the home run to have traveled 650 feet. However, aerial photographs measurements put the distance at 700–733 feet, which would make it the longest home run ever hit in professional baseball. The ball itself was signed by Carter and notes the distance of 733 feet.

Gil Carter was inducted into the National Baseball Congress Hall of Fame in 2015.

The ballpark
The Potashers played home minor league games at Montgomery Field. Montgomery Field had a capacity of 2,500 and dimensions of (Left, Center, Right) 340–390–340. The ballpark is no longer in existence.

Timeline

Year–by–year records

Notable alumni

Gil Carter (1957–1959) Inducted National Baseball Congress Hall of Fame (2015)
Billy Connors (1961)
Merv Connors (1953)
Walt Dixon (1959, MGR)
Jonas Gaines (1956–1957)
Tom Jordan (1956–1957)
Lou Klein (1961, MGR)
Pat McLaughlin (1953–1954, MGR)
Bob Raudman (1961)
René Solís (1954)
Jimmy Stewart (1960)
Thurman Tucker (1955–1956, MGR) MLB All-Star
Verlon Walker (1960, MGR)
Jesse White (1954)
Tony York (1958, MGR)

See also
Carlsbad Potashers players

References

Chicago Cubs minor league affiliates
Defunct minor league baseball teams
Sports teams in New Mexico
Carlsbad, New Mexico
Defunct baseball teams in the United States
Baseball teams disestablished in 1961
Baseball teams established in 1953
Defunct baseball teams in New Mexico
Professional baseball teams in New Mexico
1953 establishments in New Mexico
1961 disestablishments in New Mexico
Longhorn League teams